The 2022 Boston College Eagles football team represented Boston College as a member of the Atlantic Coast Conference (ACC) during the 2022 NCAA Division I FBS football season. Led by third-year head coach Jeff Hafley, the Eagles played their home games at Alumni Stadium in Chestnut Hill, Massachusetts.

Offseason

Recruits

Transfer portal

Outgoing transfers
Boston College lost 13 players to the NCAA transfer portal.

Incoming transfers
Boston College received four players from the college football transfer portal.

Schedule
Boston College announced its 2022 football schedule on January 31, 2022. The 2022 schedule consists of six home games and six away games in the regular season. The Eagles hosted ACC foes Louisville, Clemson, Duke, and Syracuse and traveled to Virginia Tech, Florida State, Wake Forest, and NC State.

The Eagles hosted two of the four non-conference opponents, Rutgers from the Big Ten and Maine from Division I FCS, and traveled to UConn and Notre Dame with both teams being from FBS Independents.

Game summaries

Rutgers

at Virginia Tech

Maine

at Florida State

Louisville

No. 5 Clemson

at No. 13 Wake Forest

at UConn

Duke

at No. 16 NC State

at No. 18 Notre Dame

Syracuse

References

Boston College
Boston College Eagles football seasons
Boston College Eagles football
Boston College Eagles football